Faizabad Interchange is a cloverleaf interchange which serves as a junction between Islamabad Highway and Murree Road in Islamabad, Pakistan.

Constructed by NESPAK at a cost of Rs 130 million (£745,000), the interchange was completed in January 1998, making it the first modern cloverleaf interchange in Pakistan. Over 100,000 vehicles use this interchange daily and serves a major entry and exit point to Islamabad and Rawalpindi. The interchange is only a few cloverleaf interchanges in the world where three roads have been joined rather than two, linking the Islamabad Expressway, Murree Road, and Pir Wadhai Road.

References

See also
 2017 Tehreek-e-Labaik protest

Islamabad
Road interchanges in Pakistan
Rawalpindi District